The Lahaul and Spiti district in the Indian state of Himachal Pradesh consists of the two formerly separate districts of Lahaul and Spiti (or ). The present administrative center is Kyelang in Lahaul. Before the two districts were merged, Kardang was the capital of Lahaul, and Dhankar the capital of Spiti. The district was formed in 1960 and is the fourth least populous district in India (out of 640). It is the least densely populated district of India, according to the Census of India 2011.

Geography
Geologically located on the Tibetan Plateau, Lahaul and Spiti district is connected to Manali through the Rohtang Pass. Kunzum la or the Kunzum Pass (altitude ) is the entrance pass to the Spiti Valley from Lahaul. To the south, Spiti ends  from Tabo, at the Sumdo where the road enters Kinnaur and joins National Highway 5.

It is surrounded by lofty ranges, with the Spiti River rushing out of a gorge in the southeast to meet the Sutlej River. It is a typical mountain desert area with an average annual rainfall of only .

The district has close cultural links with Ngari Prefecture of Tibet Autonomous Region.

Flora and fauna 

The harsh conditions of Lahaul permit only scattered tufts of hardy grasses and shrubs to grow, even below . Due to changes in climate, people in the Lahaul valley are able to grow some vegetables like cabbages, potatoes, green peas, radishes, tomatoes, carrots and leafy vegetables. The main cash crops are potatoes, cabbages, and green peas.

Some of the most common species of flora found in the Valley of Spiti include Cousinia thomsonii, Seseli trilobum, Crepis flexuosa, Caragana brevifolia and Krascheninnikovia ceratoides. There are over 62 species of medicinal plants found there as well.

Several species of juniper grow in the valley, noted for their adaptation to the cold desert climate conditions. They are used by local people for religious purposes and for subsistence. The juniper forests are threatened by overuse and habitat degradation.

The valley is inhabited by snow leopards, foxes ibex, Himalayan brown bear, musk deer, and Himalayan blue sheep. Snow leopards are protected within the Pin Valley National Park and Kibber Wildlife Sanctuary. The Lingti plains are home to animals such as yaks and dzos.

Over-hunting and a decrease in food supplies have led to a large reduction in the population of the Tibetan antelope, argali, kiangs, musk deer, and snow leopards in these regions, reducing them to the status of endangered species. The locals of Spiti do not hunt these wild animals due to their religious beliefs.

Demographics

According to the 2011 census, the Lahaul and Spiti district has a population of 31,564. This gives it a ranking of 638th in India (out of a total of 640). Its population growth rate over the decade 2001-2011 was -5%. Lahul and Spiti has a sex ratio of 903 females for every 1000 males, and a literacy rate of 76.81%. The entire population is rural. Scheduled Castes and Scheduled Tribes make up 7.08% and 81.44% of the population respectively.

The district has % of its population speaking Kinnauri, % Pattani, % Bhotia, % Hindi, % Nepali and % Tibetan as their first language.

The language, culture, and populations of Lahaul and Spiti are closely related. Generally, the Lahaulis are of Tibetan and Indo-Aryan descent, while the Spiti Bhot is closer to the Tibetans, owing to their proximity to Tibet. The district has a Himachal Pradesh state legislative law in place to curb antique looting by travelers given past incidents. In the pre-independence era, the ethnic tribal belt was divided into the British Lahaul and the Chamba Lahaul, which was merged with Punjab post-1947. This is the second-largest district in the Indian union.

The language spoken by both the Lahauli and Spiti Bhots is Bhoti, a Tibetic language of the Western Innovative subgroup. They are very similar to the Ladakh I and Tibetans culturally, as they had been placed under the rule of the Guge and Ladakh kingdoms at occasional intervals.

Among the Lahaulis, the family acts as the basic unit of kinship. The extended family system is common and evolved from the polyandric system of the past. The family is headed by a senior male member, known as the Yunda, while his wife, known as the Yundamo, attains authority by being the oldest member of the generation. The clan system, also known as Rhus, plays another major role in the Lahauli society.

The Spiti Bhot community has an inheritance system that is otherwise unique to the Tibetans. Upon the death of both parents, only the eldest son will inherit the family property, while the eldest daughter inherits the mother's jewelry, and the younger siblings inherit nothing. Men usually fall back on the social security system of the Trans-Himalayan Gompas.

Lifestyle

The lifestyles of the Lahauli and Spiti Bhot are similar, owing to their proximity. Polyandry was widely practised by the Lahaulis in the past, although this practice has been dying out. The Spiti Bhot does not generally practice polyandry anymore, although it is accepted in a few isolated regions.

Divorces are accomplished by a simple ceremony performed in the presence of village elders. Divorce can be sought by either partner. The husband has to pay compensation to his ex-wife if she does not remarry. However, this is uncommon among the Lahaulis.

Agriculture is the main source of livelihood. Potato farming is common. Occupations include animal husbandry, working in government programs and services, and other businesses and crafts that include weaving. Houses are constructed in the Tibetan architectural style, as the land in Lahul and Spiti is mountainous and quite prone to earthquakes.

Religion

Most of the Lahaulis follow a combination of Hinduism and Tibetan Buddhism of the Drukpa Kagyu order, while the Spiti Bhotia follow Tibetan Buddhism of the Gelugpa order. Within Lahaul, the Todh-Gahr (upper region of Lahaul towards Ladakh) region had the strongest Buddhist influence, owing to its close proximity to Spiti.

Before the spread of Tibetan Buddhism and Hinduism, the people were adherents of the religion 'Lung Pe Chhoi', an animistic religion that had some affinities with the Bön the religion of Tibet. While the religion flourished, animal and human sacrifices were regularly offered up to the 'Iha', a term that refers to evil spirits residing in the natural world, notably in the old pencil-cedar trees, rocks, and caves. Vestiges of the Lung Pe Chhoi religion can be seen in the behavior of the Lamas, who are believed to possess certain supernatural powers.

The Losar festival (also known as Halda in Lahauli) is celebrated between the months of January and February. The date of the celebration is decided by the Lamas. It has the same significance as the Diwali festival of Hinduism, but is celebrated in a Tibetan fashion.

At the start of the festival, two or three persons from every household will walk in the procession holding burning incense. The burning sticks are then piled into a bonfire. The people will then pray to Shiskar Apa, the goddess of wealth (another name Vasudhara) in the Buddhist religion.

Buddhist monasteries 
Spiti is one of the important centers of Buddhism in Himachal Pradesh. It is popularly known as the 'land of lamas'. The valley is dotted by numerous Buddhist Monasteries or Gompas. These are some of the important monasteries in the Lahul and Spiti valleys.

Kye Monastery: Kye Monastery is one of the main learning centers of Buddhist studies in Spiti. The monastery is home to some 100-odd monks who receive their education here. It is the oldest and biggest monastery in Spiti. It houses rare paintings and scriptures of Buddha and other gods and goddesses. There are also rare 'Thangka' paintings and ancient musical instruments 'like trumpets, cymbals, and drums in the monastery.

Tabo Monastery: Perched at an altitude of 3050 meters, Tabo Monastery is often referred to as the 'Ajanta of the Himalayas'. It is located 45  km from Kaza, Himachal Pradesh, the capital of the Spiti region. This monastery garnered interest when it celebrated its thousandth year of existence in 1996. The Tabo Monastery was founded by scholar Richen Zangpo. The monastery houses more than 60 lamas and contains a collection of rare scriptures, pieces of art, and wall paintings - Thankas, and Stucco. There is a modern guest house with a dining hall and amenities.

Kardang Monastery:
Kardang Monastery, is located at an elevation of 3,500 meters across the river, about 8 km from Keylong. Kardang is well connected by the road via the Tandi bridge which is about 14 km from Keylong. Built-in the 12th century, this monastery houses a large library of Buddhist literature including the main Kangyur and Tangyur scriptures.

Tourism 

The natural scenery and numerous Buddhist monasteries are the main tourist attractions of the region.

The dangerous weather in Lahaul and Spiti permits visitors only between the months of June to October when the roads and villages are free of snow and the high passes (Rothang La and Kunzum La) are open. It is possible to access Spiti from Kinnaur (along the Sutlej) all through the year, although the road is sometimes temporarily closed by landslides or avalanches.

Adventure tourism
To-do-Trails:
The Spiti Valley is popular with trekkers due to the challenging nature of its treks. These treks take people to remote areas including rural villages and old Gompas, as well as wildlife trails. High-altitude treks allow travelers to cross passes such as Parangla Pass (connecting Ladakh with Spiti Valley), Pin Parvati Pass, Baba Pass, Hamta Pass trek, and Spiti Left Bank Trek. Popular trekking routes in the area include Kaza-Langza-Hikim-Komic-Kaza, Kaza-Ki-Kibber-Gete-Kaza, Kaza-Losar-Kunzum La, and Kaza-Tabo-Sumdo-Nako.

Skiing:
Skiing is a popular activity with tourists in Spiti.

Yak Safari:
Yak rides are used to see the flora and fauna of the trans-Himalayan desert.

Politics

 

|}

Gallery

Bhaga valley
From Baralacha La to the confluence at Tandi, Lahaul.

Chandra-Bhaga (Chenab) valley
From the confluence of the Chandra and Bhaga rivers at Tandi to Chamba district border downstream of Udaipur, Lahaul

Chandra valley
From the confluence at Tandi to Kunzum La separating Lahaul and Spiti

Spiti valley
From Kunzum La to the border with Kinnaur district at Sumdo, Spiti.

See also 
List of highest towns by country
Lahuli–Spiti languages
Lahuli language
Spiti Bhoti
Lahul Lohar language

References

Bibliography 
 Ciliberto, Jonathan. (2013). "Six Weeks in the Spiti Valley". Circle B Press. 2013. Atlanta. 
 Handa, O. C. (1987). Buddhist Monasteries in Himachal Pradesh. Indus Publishing Company, New Delhi. .
 Hutchinson, J. & J. PH Vogel (1933). History of the Panjab Hill States, Vol. II. (1st ed) Lahore: Govt. Printing, Punjab, 1933. Reprint 2000. Department of Language and Culture, Himachal Pradesh. Chapter X Lahaul, pp. 474–483; Spiti, pp. 484–488.
  Kapadia, Harish. (1999). Spiti: Adventures in the Trans-Himalaya. 2nd ed. New Delhi: Indus Publishing Company. .
 Janet Rizvi. (1996). Ladakh: Crossroads of High Asia. Second Edition. Oxford University Press, Delhi. .
 Cunningham, Alexander. (1854). LADĀK: Physical, Statistical, and Historical with Notices of the Surrounding Countries. London. Reprint: Sagar Publications (1977).
 Francke, A. H. (1977). A History of Ladakh. (Originally published as, A History of Western Tibet, (1907). 1977 Edition with critical introduction and annotations by S. S. Gergan & F. M. Hassnain. Sterling Publishers, New Delhi.
 Francke, A. H. (1914). Antiquities of Indian Tibet. Two Volumes. Calcutta. 1972 reprint: S. Chand, New Delhi.
 Banach, Benti (2010). 'A Village Called Self-Awareness, life and times in Spiti Valley'. Vajra Publications, Kathmandu .

External links 

 
 Official Website of the district

 
1960 establishments in Himachal Pradesh
Tourism in Himachal Pradesh